The 75th Writers Guild of America Awards were held on March 5, 2023, to honor the best writing in film, television and radio of 2022. The nominees for television and radio were announced on January 11, 2023, while the nominees for the film categories were announced on January 25, 2023.

The ceremony was hosted by American actress and comedian Janelle James.

Winners and nominees

Film

Television

Children's

Documentary

News

Radio

Promotional writing

References

External links 
 

2022
2022 film awards
2022 in American cinema
2022 in American television
2022 television awards
2022 awards in the United States
March 2023 events in the United States